Seaman Service Book (SSB) is a continuous record of a seaman’s service. This document certifies that the person holding is a seaman as per the International Convention on Standards of Training, Certification and Watch keeping for Seafarers (STCW), 1978, as amended from time to time. Seaman Book is one of the compulsory document for applying crew transit visas. The record of employment on board of a merchant ship (sea service) is recorded in a Seaman Service Book.  Different countries issue to their seafarers the similar service book with different names i.e. Seaman Record Book, Seaman Discharge Book etc.  In Pakistan Government Shipping Office issue this book under section 120 of Merchant Shipping Ordinance, 2001.  It is mandatory for all seafarers serving on board ship, whether they are on the Minimum Safe Manning Certificate or not, to hold a "Seaman Service Book and Seaman Identity Document" (SID).

Affairs of seamen in Pakistan
The Government Shipping Office looks after the affairs of seafarers under the Merchant Shipping Policy of Pakistan which covers the following subject of merchant navy of Pakistan:

 Registration and facilitation of Pakistani Seamen
 Issue of Seaman Service Book (SSB) and issue of Seafarers’ Identity Document (SID)
 Engagement of Seamen on Ships and Discharge of seamen from ships (Sign-on and Sign-off)
 Maintains record of service of seamen

Issuance of SSB
Pakistan's merchant marine policy for jobs on vessel set in 2001, speaks as follows:

To obtain employment on board a seagoing vessel every citizen of Pakistan is entitled to acquire a Seaman Service Book (SSB) in accordance with the provision of Merchant Shipping Ordinance 2001 subject to fulfilling the requirements as prescribed under the Rules issued from time to time, by the Government of Pakistan. No seaman can be engaged at any port of Pakistan, except  service on coasting ships,  unless the seafarer is bonafide holder of the SSB.  In case of foreign crew/merchant navy officers he must in possession of equivalent document e.g. equivalent discharge book issued by his own country. This is a prescribed certificate of identification with basic particulars and qualifications of the seaman duly registered with the Government Shipping Office. It is issued on Government sanctioned Form No. 20 by the Shipping Master under the provisions of Sections 120-138 of Merchant Shipping Ordinance, 2001. It is issued under a standard operative procedure (SOP), generally SSB contains the minimum information as given below:
(1)	 Name of seafarer,
(2)	Identification Mark
(3)	Nationality and Sex
(4)	SSB No and Computerized National Identity Card
(5)	Date of Birth	and  Place of Birth
(6)	Date of Issue	SID No.
(7)	Date of Expiry
(8)	Signature of issuing authority (Shipping Master)

Other pages of SSB contain columns for Seaman engagement and discharge record, promotion/advancement, company listing, summary of previous voyages, visa endorsement, official entries by the concerned issuing office etc.  SSB is issued from National Database Registration Authority (NADRA) after  following  prescribed procedure and deposit of fee.  The (SSB) is also liable to be cancelled, suspended or confiscated if a seaman is found to be involved in contravention of any local law.

In Pakistan one of the sources of getting SSB in the category of ship's ratings/crew is conduct of courses from private sector institutions which are commonly known as GP or GP-III courses.

SSB holders in the country
Prior to 1990 Pakistan government was practicing the policy for issuance of CDC (now SSB) only to a certain number per year in order to ensure the availability of job to each and every seamen holding CDC under roster system. Earlier, there was just one government-owned institute, namely Pakistan Marine Academy, however, after promulgation of Merchant Shipping Ordinance (2001) institutes in private sector have allowed to offer training to seamen for issuance of SSB according to their qualification and out of 10 approved institutes, five are actively conducting their business of training and education in accordance with STCW Convention.  This has increased number of SSB holders in Pakistan in access of demand.  About 40% of Pakistani seafarers are jobless for a long time. However, Government Shipping Office discloses that there are about 8,000 officers and 10,500 ratings duly registered as seamen. Out of this total number of registered seamen about 30% are employed on national as well as foreign ships. The employment on foreign ships is about 85% of the total seamen engaged in this field.

See also
Pakistan Merchant Navy
Government Shipping Office
Shipping Master
Continuous Discharge Certificate
Merchant Mariner Credential
Merchant Mariner's Document

References

Pakistan Merchant Navy
Identity documents